Aly Badara Soumah (born 24 January 1990) is a  Guinean football midfielder.

References

1990 births
Living people
Guinean footballers
Guinea international footballers
Horoya AC players
Satellite FC players
Hafia FC players
Association football midfielders
Sportspeople from Conakry